Gennady Kaskov is a former Soviet ice dancer. With former partner Ilona Melnichenko, he is the 1987 World Junior champion, 1990 Skate America bronze medallist, and 1991 Winter Universiade champion.

Career 
Originally from Odessa, Kaskov eventually moved to train in Moscow. He and his partner, Ilona Melnichenko, competed at the 1987 World Junior Championships at the Kitchener Memorial Auditorium Complex and won gold ahead of Oksana Grishuk / Alexandr Chichkov. As seniors, Melnichenko/Kaskov won gold twice at the Nebelhorn Trophy and bronze at the 1990 Skate America. After winning the 1991 Winter Universiade, the duo retired from competition.

Kaskov began coaching in Burnaby, British Columbia and then in Swan River, Manitoba. He worked at British Columbia's Centre of Excellence, the York Region Skating Academy, and Kitchener-Waterloo Skating Club, with his students including Kevin Reynolds, Matt McEwan, and Brandon Armstrong. In 2013, Kaskov began coaching at the New Hamburg Skating Club at the Wilmot Recreation Complex.

Kaskov is an International Technical Specialist for Canada.

Results
(with Melnichenko)

References

External links
 Historical Results: Junior Worlds
 World University Games Figure Skating Medalists

Navigation

Soviet male ice dancers
Canadian figure skating coaches
Living people
1970 births
Sportspeople from Odesa
World Junior Figure Skating Championships medalists
Universiade medalists in figure skating
Soviet emigrants to Canada
Universiade gold medalists for Canada
Universiade silver medalists for Canada
Competitors at the 1989 Winter Universiade
Competitors at the 1991 Winter Universiade